Gaël (feminine Gaëlle) is a Breton  given name.  
Its etymology is uncertain, it may be related to the ethnonym Gael (Goidel); alternatively, it may be a variant of the name Gwenhael (name of a 6th-century Breton saint).

While the popularity of the masculine name Gaël has been consistently at about rank 100 in France during the 2000s, the feminine name was at rank 100 in 2000 but has declined in popularity since, dropping below rank 400 by 2010.
The masculine name Gael in the United States rose steeply in popularity during the 2000s; below rank 1,000 before 2002, it rose to rank 146 in 2012. 

Gael also sees some use as a feminine given name in the United States, as a variant of Gail and Gayle (short form of Abigail).

People called Gaël (Gael)
Men:
Gaël Angoula (b. 1982), French footballer
Gaël Clichy (b. 1985), French footballer
Gaël Da Silva (b. 1984), French gymnast
Gaël Danic (b. 1981), French footballer
Gaël Etock (b. 1993), Belgian footballer
Gaël Fickou (b. 1994), French rugby player
Gael García Bernal (b. 1978), Mexican actor and producer
Gaël Germany (b. 1983), French footballer
Gaël Givet (b. 1981), French footballer
Gaël Kakuta (born 1991), footballer
Gaël Leforestier (b. 1975), French television host
Gael Margulies (b. 1994), Israeli footballer 
Gaël Monfils (b. 1986), French tennis player
Gaël Monthurel (b. 1966), French handball player
Gaël Morel (b. 1972), French film director
Gaël N'Lundulu (b. 1992), French footballer
Gaël Pencreach (b. 1977), French runner
Gaël Querin (b. 1987), French decathlete
Gaël Tallec (b. 1976), French rugby player
Gaël Touya (b. 1973), French fencer
Gaël Yanno (b. 1961), French politician representing New Caledonia

Women:

Gael Baudino (b. 1955, pen name), American fantasy author
Gael Jean Campbell-Young (b. 1973), South African-born plant taxonomist and actor
Gael Greene (1933–2022), American restaurant critic and author
Gael Mackie (b. 1988), Canadian artistic gymnast
Gael Martin (b. 1956), Australian athlete
Gael Murphy (year of birth unknown), American anti-war activist

People called Gaëlle (Gaelle)
 Anna Gaël (1943–2022), Hungarian actress
 Gaëlle Méchaly (b. 1970), French soprano
 Gaelle Adisson (b. 1974), American house/soul singer and songwriter
 Anne-Gaëlle Sidot (b. 1979), French tennis player
Gaëlle Thalmann (b. 1986),  Swiss footballer
Gaëlle Valcke (b. 1986),  Belgian field hockey player
Gaelle Mys (b. 1991), Belgian gymnast
Gaëlle Enganamouit (b. 1992), Cameroonian footballer
 Gaëlle Barlet (b. 1988),  French mountain bike orienteering competitor (champion 2011)

See also
Gail (given name)
Gale (given name)

References

French masculine given names